The 2012–13 season was Kilmarnock's fourteenth consecutive season in the Scottish Premier League, having competed in it since its inauguration in 1998–99. Kilmarnock also competed in the Scottish Cup and the League Cup of which they were the defending champions, having beaten Celtic in the Final the previous season.

Summary

Season
Kilmarnock finished ninth in the Scottish Premier League with 45 points. They reached the second round of the League Cup, losing to Stenhousemuir. Kilmarnock also reached the Quarter-final of the Scottish Cup, losing to Hibernian.

Results and fixtures

Pre season

Scottish Premier League

Scottish League Cup

Scottish Cup

Squad information

Captains

Squad
Last updated 18 May 2013

|-
|colspan="8"|Players who left the club during the 2012–13 season
|-

|}

Disciplinary record
Includes all competitive matches. 
Last updated 18 May 2013

Team statistics

League table

Division summary

Transfers

Players in

Players out

Notes

References 

2012andndash;13
Kilmarnock